Cham Seyl (also known as Sorkheh Mehr and Sorkheh Mehrī) is a village in Kuhdasht-e Shomali Rural District, in the Central District of Kuhdasht County, Lorestan Province, Iran. At the 2006 census, its population was 226, in 43 families.

References 

Towns and villages in Kuhdasht County